The list of ship launches in 1781 includes a chronological list of some ships launched in 1781.


References

1781
Ship launches